Soñando por Bailar 2011 was the first season of Soñando por Bailar, an Argentinian reality show hosted by Viviana Canosa and broadcast by El Trece. Unlike Bailando por un Sueño every week the contestants danced along with a professional dancer but the jury scored the couples with a positive vote and the remaining contestants give a negative vote to another contestant. The winner of the show danced in Bailando 2011.

The jury was composed by Marcelo Polino, Celina Rucci, Laura Fidalgo, Ángel de Brito and Jorge Lafauci, and during the first five weeks, was also part of this jury a coach.

The season premiered was on January 4, 2011 and the finale was on May 7, 2011. Eugenia Lemos was the big winner.

Contestants

Elimination chart

Negative Votes Table

Positive votes

External links
  Official website

Bailando por un Sueño (Argentine TV series)
Argentine variety television shows
2011 Argentine television seasons